Luolong District is a district of the city of Luoyang, Henan province, China.

Luolong District is located in the southeast of Luoyang city, backing the Mang Mount, facing the Yi River.

Administrative divisions
As 2012, this district is divided to 3 subdistricts, 8 towns and 1 township.
Subdistricts

Towns

Townships
Gucheng Township

References

Districts of Luoyang